bpm:tv (beats per minute television) was a Canadian English language specialty channel owned by Stornoway Communications. bpm:tv's programming was devoted to dance music, club lifestyle, and the EDM genre - electronica, house, techno, eurodance, trance.

History

In November 2000, a partnership between Stornoway Communications and Cogeco called Stornoway Communications Limited Partnership, was granted approval by the Canadian Radio-television and Telecommunications Commission (CRTC) to launch a television channel called The Dance Channel, described as "a national English-language Category 2 specialty television service devoted to all aspects of dance."

The channel was launched on September 7, 2001 as bpm:tv with a schedule largely focused on electronic dance music video programming but steered away from the European-based underground EDM and redirected its interest towards a more mainstream radio sound.

In January 2004, the CRTC approved an application by Stornoway to acquire Cogeco's interest in the service.

On April 30, 2015, Cogeco announced on their Facebook page that bpm:tv will be "shutting down operations" effective June 1, 2015.  The shutdown was subsequently confirmed by bpm:tv via an official announcement posted on their website.

Programming

The majority of bpm:tv's schedule consisted of music video-based programs. Other programs featured artist profiles, concerts, dance programming, and club lifestyle programs.

VJs & hosts

References

2001 establishments in Canada
2015 disestablishments in Canada
Dance music television channels
Defunct television networks in Canada
English-language television stations in Canada
Music video networks in Canada
Television channels and stations established in 2001
Television channels and stations disestablished in 2015